Alan Sciuto (born 28 April 1988 in Orange, California) is a former racing driver. Sciuto competed previously in the Atlantic Championship among other series.

Racing career
Sciuto started his racing career in 2001 with the SKUSA organisation. In his first season Sciuto finished 26th in the season standings of the national 80cc Junior class. The Californian won the championship in the following year beating many young prospects such as James Hinchcliffe and Graham Rahal. In 2004 Sciuto finished second in the Stars of Karting shifterkart championship. After a shootout race at Infineon Raceway Sciuto was selected for the Red Bull Junior Team in 2004.

Sciuto made his auto racing debut in the Formula BMW USA at Lime Rock Park in 2004. The following year Sciuto mainly competed in the Skip Barber National Championship after winning the Skip Barber Scholarship. Sciuto scored his first pole position in the series at Road America in the Dodge powered Reynard R/T 2000. The Californian driver finished eleventh in the championship standings. Sciuto also ran two races at Virginia International Raceway. The fast talent won his first race and finished second in the second race.

In 2005 Sciuto made his debut in the Atlantic Championship. In his second race, in the streets of Denver, Sciuto scored his first pole position. The Californian finished the race in second place. 2006 was Sciuto's first full season in the prestigious series. The best result was again in Denver finishing third. The young driver finished eighth in the championship standings. Sciuto repeated this performance the following season racing for his own team, Alan Sciuto Racing. In 2008 Sciuto made a single outing in the Atlantic Championship. In the streets of Long Beach Sciuto finished second.

Racing record

American open–wheel racing results
(key) (Races in bold indicate pole position) (Races in italics indicate fastest lap)

USF2000 National Championship results

Star Mazda Championship

Atlantic Championship results

References

1988 births
Racing drivers from California
Atlantic Championship drivers
Indy Pro 2000 Championship drivers
U.S. F2000 National Championship drivers
People from Orange, California
Living people